The Battle of Lauffeld, variously known as Lafelt, Laffeld, Lawfeld, Lawfeldt, Maastricht, or Val, took place on 2 July 1747, between Tongeren in modern Belgium, and the Dutch city of Maastricht. Part of the War of the Austrian Succession, a French army of 80,000 under Marshal Saxe defeated a Pragmatic Army of 120,000, led by the Duke of Cumberland.

Arguably the most talented general of his generation, Saxe conquered much of the Austrian Netherlands between 1744 to 1746 although he failed to achieve decisive victory. In the spring of 1747, Cumberland planned an offensive to retake Antwerp but was forced to fall back when the French threatened to cut him off from his supply base at Maastricht. When the two armies met at Lauffeld, a series of mistakes by Cumberland compromised his position and only counterattacks by the Allied cavalry prevented a serious defeat. 

The battle ended Allied hopes of regaining lost ground and Saxe captured Bergen op Zoom in September, then Maastricht in May 1748. However, financing the war had brought France close to bankruptcy and severe food shortages caused by the Royal Navy blockade worsened after defeat at Cape Finisterre in October 1747 left the French unable to defend their merchant shipping. The stalemate resulted in the October 1748 Treaty of Aix-la-Chapelle.

Background
When the War of the Austrian Succession began in 1740, Britain was focused on the 1739–1748 War of Jenkins' Ear with Spain, fought mostly in the Caribbean. British and Dutch troops in Flanders initially did so as part of the army of Hanover; France did not formally declare war on Britain until March 1744, while the Dutch Republic was technically neutral until 1747. French victory at Rocoux in October 1746 confirmed their control of the Austrian Netherlands, but failed to force Britain to agree peace terms. France entered the war to reduce the post-1713 expansion in British commercial strength which they viewed as a threat to the European balance of power, but by 1747 British trade was expanding once again while the French economy was being strangled by the Royal Navy blockade. 

By the end of 1746, most of the participants sought peace. Maria Theresa had secured her throne and was more interested in rebuilding her army in order to retake Silesia; Austria had only acquired the Austrian Netherlands in 1713 because neither the British or Dutch would allow the other to control it and retaining it was not a strategic priority. Neutrality had allowed the Dutch to become the main carriers of French imports and exports and its loss put further strain on both economies, with the Dutch government putting pressure on the British to make peace. Although the British were also incurring high levels of debt, they were far better equipped to finance it.

To keep their Allies fighting, in the January 1747 Hague Convention Britain agreed to fund Austrian and Savoyard forces in Italy, along with an Allied army of 140,000 in Flanders, increasing to 192,000 in 1748. The Duke of Newcastle, who as Secretary of State oversaw foreign policy felt the Allies were strong enough to improve their bargaining position by recovering the Netherlands, while he also anticipated the collapse of the Bourbon alliance following the death of Philip V in July 1746.  Although both assumptions proved incorrect, when Franco-British negotiations began at Breda in August 1746, Newcastle instructed his envoy, Lord Sandwich, to delay.

Battle

By taking troops from other areas, Saxe was able to assemble a field army of 120,000 men for the 1747 campaign. The defeat of the Jacobite Rising allowed Cumberland to transfer troops back to Flanders, and prepare an offensive. He hoped to capture Antwerp in February, but bad weather, lack of transport, and war weariness meant the Allies were not ready to take the field until early May. During this delay, Contades captured Fort Liefkenhock, making Antwerp too strong to attack. Simultaneously, Löwendahl seized Sas van Gent, IJzenijke and Eekels, threatening Cumberland's supply lines with Maastricht. The latter inspired an Orangist Coup in Zeeland, which eventually led to William IV being appointed first hereditary Stadtholder of all seven Dutch provinces.

To protect Maastricht, Cumberland sent von Daun to secure Tongeren, then held by Clermont-Tonnerre. The Allied cavalry under Ligonier were ordered to occupy the Tongeren-Maastricht road, which ran along a ridge parallel to the river Meuse. Finding the French already in possession, they halted for the night, with the infantry billeted in the villages of Vlytingen and Lauffeld. As at Rocoux, the Austrians were on the right, holding the villages of Grote and Kleine Spouwen, which are now part of the Belgian town of Bilzen. A steep ravine immediately in front protected them from a direct assault. The centre was held the Dutch States Army under the Prince Waldeck, while the left wing, placed around the village of Lauffeld, consisted of British, Hanoverian, and Hessian troops.

Most sources suggest around 82,000 French troops faced a slightly smaller Allied army, although estimates vary. The next day was overcast, and heavy rain made movement slow and difficult, so the battle began with an exchange of artillery fire at 6:00 am, which continued until 8:30. The British and German infantry left the villages where they had spent the night, having first set them on fire to prevent their use by the French, and formed up on open ground. Based on his experience at Fontenoy, Ligonier urged they be used as fortified positions; after some hesitation, Cumberland agreed. Saxe assumed the Allies were retreating across the Meuse, and around 10:30 sent troops into what he assumed were now empty villages.

While true of Vlytingen, Lauffeld had been re-occupied by troops under Frederick of Hesse-Kassel, and the next four hours developed into a fierce struggle. The French finally captured Lauffeld around 12:30 pm, after taking heavy casualties in a series of frontal assaults. Cumberland ordered a counter-attack but as the infantry formed up, a Dutch cavalry unit to their front was routed by the French and fled, throwing those behind them into disorder and exposing the Allied centre. The Dutch in the centre had until now not been able to do more than two fruitless attacks with part of the infantry, both times beaten back by French artillery, losing 537 men. When the Allied left gave way, the Dutch and Austrians followed, in the expression of an eyewitness, 'like lambs', and the battle was lost.

Meanwhile, 150 squadrons of French cavalry had assembled around Wilre, preparing to attack Cumberland's flank; unaware the Allies were falling back on Maastricht, Ligonier and 60 squadrons charged, taking them by surprise. One of the best known cavalry charges in British military history, Saxe later claimed only this prevented him destroying the Allied army. The French Irish Brigade suffered more than 1,400 casualties; at one point, the short-sighted Cumberland mistook the red-coated Irish for his own troops, and barely escaped being taken prisoner. To cover the retreating infantry, Ligonier obtained permission for another charge, this time with only three regiments. He was taken prisoner, while the Scots Greys, one of the units involved, lost nearly 40% of their strength. This action allowed time for Karl Josef Batthyány and his Austrians to cover the Allied withdrawal.

Aftermath

Estimates of total casualties vary, ranging from between 5,000 to 11,000 killed or wounded on either side. As on previous occasions, Saxe failed to follow up vigorously, leading to accusations from his critics that he was deliberately seeking to prolong the war in order to strengthen his own prestige. Lauffeld was thus another French victory that failed to achieve a decisive result, although it led to the capture of Bergen-op-Zoom in September and Maastricht in May 1748. It provided further proof of Cumberland's weaknesses as a general, all of which had been factors in his earlier defeat at Fontenoy in 1745. These included inadequate reconnaissance, lack of strategic awareness, and poor co-ordination with his senior commanders, as shown by his failure to inform Ligonier he had withdrawn the infantry. 

Despite their success in Flanders, the British naval blockade caused a collapse in French customs receipts, and cut them off from the Newfoundland cod fisheries, a key food supply for the poor. Finance Minister Machault repeatedly warned Louis XV of the impending collapse of their financial system. Their position deteriorated further in October 1747 when the Royal Navy attacked a large convoy on its way to the West Indies at Cape Finisterre in October 1747. Despite the loss of their naval escort, most of the merchantmen escaped but warned of their approach, the British Leeward Islands Squadron under Commodore George Pocock was able to intercept many of them in late 1747 and early 1748. As a result of this defeat, the French navy could no longer protect their colonies or trade routes. 

In November, Britain and Russia signed a convention for the supply of additional troops and in February 1748, a Russian corps of 37,000 arrived in the Rhineland. However, by now Newcastle was also ready to agree terms, although it has been argued he failed to appreciate the impact of the naval blockade on the French economy. The terms of the Treaty of Aix-la-Chapelle were first agreed by Britain and France at Breda, then presented to their allies. These confirmed Prussian possession of Silesia and minor territorial adjustments in Italy, but essentially returned the situation to 1740, with France withdrawing from the Low Countries. Returning the territorial gains which had cost so much, in exchange for so little, led to the phrase "as stupid as the Peace".

The war confirmed the decline of the Dutch Republic as a major power and Newcastle berated himself for his "ignorance, obstinacy, and credulity", in believing otherwise. The search for a Continental ally to replace the Dutch drove British acceptance of the Prussian conquest of Silesia; this in turn caused the breakdown of the Anglo-Austrian Alliance, and led to the re-alignment known as the Diplomatic Revolution.

References

Sources
 
 
 
 

 
 
 
 
 
 
 
 
 
 

 
 
 
 
 
 
 
 
 

Battles of the War of the Austrian Succession
Battles involving Great Britain
Battles involving Hanover
Battles involving the Netherlands
Battles involving France
Battles involving the Austrian Netherlands
Battle of Lauffeld
1747 in France
Battle
1747 in the Holy Roman Empire
1747 in the Habsburg monarchy